Cene Prevc (born 12 March 1996) is a retired Slovenian ski jumper.

Career 
On 18 February 2013, Prevc won the individual event at the 2013 European Youth Olympic Winter Festival (EYOF) with a combined points of 261.0. With this victory Cene followed the path of his brother Peter, who also won the EYOF individual event back in 2009. He made his World Cup debut in the 2013–14 season in Planica.

In 2022, he ended his ski jumping career to focus on studying.

Personal life
Prevc was born in Kranj to Božidar and Julijana Prevc; the family has since been living in the village of Dolenja Vas. He has two brothers and two sisters. Both his brothers, Peter and Domen, and one of his sisters, Nika, are also FIS Ski Jumping World Cup jumpers. His father, who owns a furniture business, is also an international ski jumping referee.

World Cup

Standings

Individual starts

References

External links 
 

1996 births
Living people
Sportspeople from Kranj
Slovenian male ski jumpers
Olympic ski jumpers of Slovenia
Ski jumpers at the 2022 Winter Olympics
Medalists at the 2022 Winter Olympics
Olympic silver medalists for Slovenia
Olympic medalists in ski jumping
Prevc family
21st-century Slovenian people